Uno Öhrlund (born 22 May 1937) is a retired Swedish ice hockey player who won a silver medal at the 1964 Winter Olympics. Between 1957 and 1965 he played 85 times with the Swedish national team and scored 57 goals. He won a world title in 1962, finishing second in 1963 and third in 1965.

Öhrlund never won a Swedish title, but was selected to the Swedish all-star team in 1964. He also played association football with Västerås and bandy with Svartådalens SK at the Swedish championships.

References

1937 births
Living people
Ice hockey players at the 1964 Winter Olympics
Olympic ice hockey players of Sweden
Swedish ice hockey players
Olympic medalists in ice hockey
Olympic silver medalists for Sweden
Medalists at the 1964 Winter Olympics
Swedish footballers
Swedish bandy players
Association footballers not categorized by position
People from Gävle
Sportspeople from Gävleborg County